Computer crime, or cybercrime in Canada, is an evolving international phenomenon. People and businesses in 
Canada and other countries may be affected by computer crimes that may, or may not originate within the borders of their country. From a Canadian perspective, 'computer crime' may be considered to be defined by the Council of Europe – Convention on Cybercrime (November 23, 2001). Canada contributed, and is a signatory, to this international  of criminal offences involving the use of computers:

 Offences against the confidentiality, integrity and availability of computer data and systems;
 Computer-related offences;
 Content-related offences;
 Offences related to infringements of copyright and related rights; and
 Ancillary liability.

Canada is also a signatory to the Additional Protocol to the Convention on Cybercrime, concerning the criminalization of acts of a racist and xenophobic nature committed through computer systems (January 28, 2003). As of July 25, 2008 Canada had not yet ratified the Convention on Cybercrime or the Additional Protocol to the Convention on cybercrime, concerning the criminalization of acts of a Discriminatory nature committed through computer systems.

Canadian computer crime laws 

The Criminal Code contains a set of laws dealing with computer crime issues.

Criminal Offences Contained in the Convention on Cybercrime (November 23, 2001) 

As Canada has not yet ratified the Convention on Cybercrime its Criminal Code may not fully address the areas of criminal law set out in the Convention on Cybercrime.

Computer-related offences 
 Computer-related forgery
 Computer-related fraud

Content-related offences 
 Offences related to child pornography

Offences related to infringements of copyright and related rights

Ancillary liability 
 Attempt and aiding or abetting
 Corporate liability

Criminal offences in the Additional Protocol to the Convention on Cybercrime 

As Canada has not yet ratified this Additional Protocol to the Convention on cybercrime, its Criminal Code may not fully address the following criminal offences:

 Dissemination of racist and xenophobic material through computer systems
 Racist and xenophobic motivated threat
 Racist and xenophobic motivated insult
 Denial, gross minimization, approval or justification of genocide or crimes against humanity
 Aiding and abetting

Laws 

 Criminal Code
 Section 342 of the Criminal Code deals with theft, forgery of credit cards and unauthorized use of computer
 Section 184 of the Criminal Code deals with privacy
 Section 402 of the Criminal Code deals with Identity theft
 Section 403 of the Criminal Code deals with Identity fraud

Canadian computer criminals 

 The Canadian hacker group 'The Brotherhood of Warez' hacked the Canadian Broadcasting Corporation's website on April 20, 1997; replacing the homepage with the message "The Media Are Liars"

References 

 
Canada